Aquaforum Lázně Františkovy Lázně is a water park in Františkovy Lázně in the Karlovy Vary Region of the Czech Republic.

References

Water parks in the Czech Republic